Shāriyah (born c. 815 in al-Basra; died c. 870 C.E.) was an ‘Abbasid qayna (enslaved singing-girl), who enjoyed a prominent place in the court of Al-Wathiq (r. 842–847).

Biography

The main source for Shāriyah's life is the tenth-century Kitāb al-Aghānī of Abū ’l-Faraj al-Iṣfahānī.

Shāriya seems to have been an illegitimate daughter of a Qurashī and was sold into slavery by a woman claiming to be her mother to the ‘Abbasid prince Ibrahīm ibn al-Mahdī, son of third Abbasid caliph, al-Mahdi (r. 775–785), and half-brother of the fifth caliph Harun al-Rashid (r. 786–809) and the poet and princess ‘Ulayya bint al-Mahdī. There was later some dispute about the sale, as Shāriyah's alleged mother tried to claim that she was freeborn, in an effort to cash in on her daughter's success; but Ibrahīm retained ownership of Shāriya until she was manumitted during the reign either of al-Muʿtaṣim (r. 833–842) or al-Wathiq. Her greatest success was at al-Wathiq's court.

Works

The most important attestation of Shāriyah's poetry and skill comes in the form of an account of a musical contest between her and her older rival ‘Arīb al-Ma’mūnīya (and their respective troupes of singing-girls) in Sāmarrā’, reported in Abū ’l-Faraj al-Iṣfahānī's Kitāb al-Aghānī. It probably took place in the reign of al-Mutawakkil (r. 847–861). The description is also an important attestation of the activities of female musicians in ‘Abbasid courtly life. According to the account, "at that time, the refined and well-bred people were divided into two communities – one supported ‘Arīb (‘Arībiyya) and the other backed Shāriya (Shārawiyya). Each party  favored the singer whom they admired in terms of applause, ṭarab [climactic moments], and improvisation".

The account opens:
One day we sat together at Abū ‘Isa ibn al-Mutawakkil’s, who had invited us for a morning drink. With me were also Ja‘far ibn al-Ma’mun, Sulaymān ibn Wahb and Ibrāhīm ibn al-Mudabbir, furthermore ‘Arīb and Shāriya and their singing-girls. We were all filled with joy, when Bid‘a, ‘Arīb’s slave-girl, sang:

This song was by ‘Arīb. Then ‘Irfān sang: 

This song was by Shāriya.

References

Women poets from the Abbasid Caliphate
Arabic-language women poets
Arabic-language poets
9th-century women writers
9th-century Arabic writers
9th-century deaths
Year of birth uncertain
9th-century women from the Abbasid Caliphate
Arabian slaves and freedmen
Qiyan
9th-century women musicians
Slaves from the Abbasid Caliphate
People from Basra
Singers of the medieval Islamic world
Medieval Arabic singers